Kalateh-ye Bozorg may refer to:
 Kalateh-ye Bozorg, North Khorasan
 Kalateh-ye Bozorg, Razavi Khorasan